Paulina Nin de Cardona Muñoz (born August 2, 1960) is a Chilean primary school teacher and television presenter. She has worked in TVN's news program 60 Minutos, and conducted Canal 13's morning show La Mañana, in 1999.

In 2004, Nin de Cardona ran for Mayor of Pichilemu, but she was defeated by Jorge Vargas González.

References

External links
 

1960 births
Living people
People from Santiago
Chilean television personalities
Independent Democratic Union politicians